Anclados (Anchored) is a Spanish sitcom produced by Globomedia for Telecinco. The show focuses on the crew of a low-cost cruise ship.

Cast
 Miren Ibarguren : Marga Santaella
 Alfonso Lara : Campillo
 Joaquín Reyes : Mariano
 Úrsula Corberó : Natalia
 Miki Esparbé : Raimundo
 Fernando Gil : Gabriel
 Alberto Jo Lee : Josep Lluís
 Sara Vega : Tere
 Veki G. Velilla : Olivia
 Rossy de Palma : Palmira

Controversy
The show has been criticized for its portrayal of Romani people. In June 2015, the Andalusian Federation of Female Gypsy Students sued the television series for its stereotyping of Roma as criminals.

References

2010s Spanish comedy television series
2015 Spanish television series debuts
2015 Spanish television series endings
Spanish television sitcoms
Fictional ships
Nautical television series
Spanish satirical television shows
Telecinco network series
Television series by Globomedia